"Get That Love" is a song by the British pop group Thompson Twins, released in 1987 as the lead single from their sixth studio album Close to the Bone. It was written by Alannah Currie and Tom Bailey, and produced by Rupert Hine and Bailey. "Get That Love" peaked at number 66 in the UK Singles Chart and spent four weeks in the Top 100. It fared better in America where it reached number 31 on the US Billboard Hot 100.

Promotion
A music video was filmed to promote the single. It was directed by Andy Morahan and was produced by Richard Bell for Vivid Productions. It received medium rotation on MTV. The duo also performed the song on the UK TV talk show Wogan, backed by drummer Geoff Dugmore (who had played on the Close to the Bone album, though it is unclear whether he or Currie performed drums on "Get that Love" specifically), bassist Robin Goodfellow, and keyboardist Carrie Booth.

Critical reception
On its release, Martin Shaw of Record Mirror commented, "A poppy, fonky piece of black slate, summed up by its ponderous brass constructed interlude. Like the Durannies, the Thompson Twins take a ride on the back of the dance explosion and water it down to a whimper." Len Brown of New Musical Express noted, "Here the Twins return to their comparatively more appealing 'Love On Your Side'/'In the Name of Love' tempo. It's still the same song – described in the press release as a 'distinct departure for them' – and thus certainly a hit."

In the United States, Billboard described "Get That Love" as a "cheerful pop romp" which "seems to signal a swing back to jumpy spontaneity over hi-tech polish". Cash Box picked the single as one of their "feature picks" of March 1987 and described it as a "sparkling pop spectacle", with a "good, solid performance".

Formats
7" Single
"Get That Love" – 4:00
"Perfect Day" – 4:26

12" Single
"Get That Love (Extended version)" – 6:28
"Get That Love (7" version)" – 4:00
"Perfect Day" – 4:26

12" Single (America only
"Get That Love (7" version)" – 3:57
"Perfect Day" – 4:26
"Get That Love (Extended version)" – 6:25
"Get That Love (Dub)" – 6:58

CD Single
"Get That Love (Extended version)" – 6:33
"Perfect Day" – 4:31
"Get That Love (Dub)" – 7:03
"Get That Love (7" version)" – 4:03

Personnel
 Tom Bailey – lead vocals, keyboards, guitar, bass, associate producer, programming
 Alannah Currie – percussion, backing vocals, artwork direction

Additional personnel
 Rupert Hine – producer
 Geoff Dugmore - drums
 Griff Fender, Pikey Butler, The Mint Juleps – backing vocals
 Stephen W. Tayler – engineer
 Andie Airfix, Satori – artwork design
 Carrie Branovan – photography

Chart performance

References

1987 songs
1987 singles
Arista Records singles
Music videos directed by Andy Morahan
Song recordings produced by Tom Bailey (musician)
Song recordings produced by Rupert Hine
Songs written by Tom Bailey (musician)
Songs written by Alannah Currie
Thompson Twins songs